The following are the records of Morocco in Olympic weightlifting. Records are maintained in each weight class for the snatch lift, clean and jerk lift, and the total for both lifts by the Federation Royale Marocaine.

Current records

Men

Women

Historical records

Women (1998–2018)

References

External links

Morocco
records
Olympic weightlifting
weightlifting